Heidelberg Airport  is a small airport located in Heidelberg, South Africa.  The airport is registered at a Category 2 aerodrome and managed by the Heidelberg Aviation Association.  It mainly accommodates light and ultra-light aircraft.

The Heidelberg Aviation Association maintains and improves the facilities with funds mainly collected from its members

A medical helipad named "The David Powell Aeromedical Rescue Facility" has been added for medical evacuation and transfers.

The facility was officially opened by the wife and brother of the late David Powell on 18 November 2017 accompanied by his wife and a large crowd of aviators, friends and medical staff from Emer-G-Med and Netcare 911.

A flight school named Inversion Flight Academy has been operating here since 2016.

Airfield information
 Communication Frequencies
 Heidelberg Airport 125.90 MHz
 Only Left hand circuits.
 Runways 06-24
 Elevation 5118'
Runway 16-34 grass is closed

References

External links
Heidelberg Aviation Association

Airports in South Africa
Sedibeng District Municipality
Transport in Gauteng